This is an incomplete list of recent hunger strikes and people who have conducted a hunger strike.

Hunger strikes
1923 Irish hunger strikes - thousands of Irish Republican prisoners demand release. Includes info on 1920 Mountjoy and Cork hunger strikes. Six deaths.  
1980 Irish hunger strike – Protest by Irish republican prisoners from Northern Ireland against the rescindment of Special Category Status during The Troubles
Brendan Hughes
Tommy McKearney
Raymond McCartney
1981 Irish hunger strike – ended with 10 of the participants starving themselves to death, radicalizing Irish nationalist politics and leading to Sinn Féin becoming a mainstream political party. 
Paddy Quinn 
1983 International Fast For Life (thousands fasted against nuclear armament and world hunger) – Protest against President Ronald Reagan's increased defense spending and the escalation of the Cold War nuclear arms race
1986 Veterans Fast For Life – Protest against the Reagan administration's support for the Contra insurgency in Sandinista Nicaragua
2000 Death fast in Turkey – Protest by inmates of Turkish F-Type Prisons 
Guantánamo Bay hunger strikes – Prisoner protests at Guantanamo Bay detention camp, a notorious U.S. military prison known for indefinite detention without trial and torture, during the War on terror
Ahmed Zaid Salim Zuhair
2009 Tamil diaspora protests – Worldwide protest against the Sri Lankan Civil War
2012 Palestinian mass hunger strikes – Protest by Palestinian prisoners against Israeli administrative detention
Khader Adnan
2012 Kurdish prisoners hunger strike – Part of Peace and Democracy Party demonstrations against Turkish restrictions on Kurdish civil rights during the Kurdish–Turkish conflict and the Arab Spring
2013 California prisoner hunger strike – Protest against indefinite solitary confinement at Pelican Bay State Prison and for better conditions at High Desert State Prison.
2021 Youth hunger strike for democracy—Protest by 20 Arizona college students to urge the White House and the US Senate to pass the Freedom to Vote Act.

Groups who have conducted hunger strikes
British and American suffragettes
Alice Paul
Emmeline Pankhurst
Marion Wallace Dunlop
Cuban dissidents
Guillermo Fariñas
Pedro Luis Boitel
Jorge Luis García Pérez
Orlando Zapata Tamayo
Jesús Joel Díaz Hernández
José Daniel Ferrer
Darsi Ferrer Ramírez
René Gómez Manzano
Grup Yorum
Helin Bölek
Ibrahim Gökçek

Irish republicans all died while on hunger strike.
Thomas Ashe (1917)
Terence MacSwiney (1920 Cork hunger strike)
Michael Fitzgerald (1920 Cork hunger strike)
Joe Murphy (1920 Cork hunger strike)
Denny Barry (1923 Irish hunger strikes)
Andy O'Sullivan (1923 Irish hunger strikes)
Joseph Whitty (1923 Irish hunger strikes)
Tony D'Arcy (1940)
Jack McNeela (1940)
Seán McCaughey (1946)
Michael Gaughan (1974)
Frank Stagg (1976)
Michael Devine (1981)
Kieran Doherty (1981) - while on hunger strike was elected to the Republic of Irelands Dáil Éireann, representing the Cavan–Monaghan constituency.
Francis Hughes (1981)
Martin Hurson (1981)
Kevin Lynch (1981)
Raymond McCreesh (1981)
Joe McDonnell (1981)
Thomas McElwee (1981)
Patsy O'Hara (1981) 
Bobby Sands (1981)  – leader of the hunger strike; elected to the House of Commons during the strike before his death.

Indian Independence Movement
Jatindra Nath Das
Batukeshwar Dutt
Bhagat Singh
Mahatma Gandhi
Jailed Catalan pro-independence leaders
Jordi Sánchez
Jordi Turull
Joaquim Forn
Josep Rull
Undocumented migrants in Belgium

Individuals who have conducted a hunger strike
Alaa Abdelfattah, Egyptian
Maher al-Akhras, Palestinian
Meryem Altun, Turkish prisoner
Ninoy Aquino 
Stanislav Aseyev, Ukrainian writer and journalist. Kidnapped by militants from so-called Donetsk People's Republic.
Igor Bancer, Polish Belarusian musician, activist, journalist, worker, and events organiser.
Marwan Barghouti 
Chen Shui Bian, President of the Republic of China
Franklin Brito, Venezuela, land dispute, 2010. Died. 
Emil Calmanovici, Communist Romania, political prisoner, 1956. Died. 
Cesar Chavez, leader of the United Farm Workers union, Arizona, 1968, 1970, 1972. 
William (Bill) Coleman, 2007 to 2014 in CT, USA 
Alfredo Cospito - Italian anarchist prisoner who started an hunger strike on 20 October 2022 against the 41-bis prison regime.
Jatindra Nath Das Indian independence activist and revolutionary
Andrey Derevyankin
Katherine Dunham
Ronald Easterbrook England, prisoner, 1997, 1999.
Becky Edelsohn
Mahatma Gandhi – Indian independence activist, part of campaign of nonviolent resistance to British rule in India
Akbar Ganji
Kasra Nouri
Andrias Ghukasyan
Max Goldstein
Lena Hades
Anna Hazare
J. B. S. Haldane
Barry Horne
Samer Tariq Issawi
Poopathy Kanapathipillai
Jack Kevorkian
Mustafa Kocak, starved himself to death in protest of his sentencing without a fair trial
Jawar Mohammed, Ethiopian politician and activist, 2021
Jüri Kukk
Jean Lassalle
Antonio Ledezma, Venezuelan politician, 2009
Gloria Lee
Ly Tong
Haia Lifşiţ
Ihar Losik, Belarusian blogger
Joe Madison,known as “The Black Eagle," radio personality and human and civil rights activist, 2021
Anatoly Marchenko
Holger Meins
Akbar Mohammadi
Abel Muzorewa, Zimbabwean politician and cleric, 1983
Tony Nicklinson
Jock Palfreeman
Vasudev Balwant Phadke
Darshan Singh Pheruman
Kemal Pir
Muhammad al-Qiq 
Mahmudur Rahman, Bangladeshi news editor
Militão Ribeiro
Randall Robinson
George Rolph
Hoda Saber
Arash Sadeghi
Andrei Sakharov
Kostas Sakkas
Nigamananda Saraswati – Protest against illegal mining in the Ganges River
Jaume Sastre i Font, Catalan teacher in Mallorca
Nadiya Savchenko, Ukrainian Ground Forces helicopter pilot, kidnapped and detained in Russian prison, 2015 and 2016.
Oleg Sentsov, Ukrainian filmmaker and writer
Irom Sharmila
Bhagat Singh Indian socialist revolutionary 
Surat Singh Khalsa, Sikh Activist
Mitch Snyder, Homeless Advocate
Mohamed Soltan, Egyptian opposition activist, 2014
Theresa Spence
Potti Sreeramulu Indian revolutionary, specifically for the Andhra region independence movement.
Thileepan (Rasaiah Parthipan)
Judith Todd Political activist regarding Zimbabwe.
Sergey Udaltsov, Russian opposition activist, 2011 and 2014
Lluís Maria Xirinacs, Catalan politician, writer, and religious leader
Lin Yi-hsiung – Protest against the construction of the Lungmen Nuclear Power Plant in New Taipei City
Shahrokh Zamani, Iranian Labour Activist, Died 2015 in Islamic Republic of Iran's prison
Govinda K.C. Nepali orthopaedic surgeon and philanthropic activist.
Ebru Timtik, Kurdish-Turkish human rights lawyer, Died 2020
Bekele Gerba, Oromo politician promoting non-violence, 2021
Alexei Navalny, Russian opposition leader and anti-corruption activist, 2021.
Parit Chiwarak and Panusaya Sithijirawattanakul, jailed pro-democratic activists, 2021 – demanding justice and scrapping of Lese majeste in Thailand
Jeanine Áñez, jailed former president of Bolivia, 2022.
Vojislav Šešelj, Serbian politician

References

Civil disobedience
Protest tactics
strikes